The Canadian Home Builders' Association (CHBA) is a not-for-profit organization representing residential construction and related industry firms in Canada. It was founded in 1943, following closely the adoption of the National Building Code of Canada in 1941, and today claims a membership of over 9000. The organization represents member interests to local, provincial and federal governments, and develops positions and solutions to support technical currency and solution pathways for members. Member companies include home builders and renovators, land developers, trade contractors, product and material manufacturers, building product suppliers, lending institutions, insurance providers, and service professionals.

CHBA provides information to new home buyers and home owners to understand processes, planning and regulations surrounding home ownership. CHBA is a resource for locating contractors for new builds or renovations, and working through safety standards, insurance and warranty issues.

Net Zero Council 
CHBA’s Net Zero Energy Housing Council (NZC) stated goal is to support innovation in the industry, creating a market advantage for CHBA member builders and renovators pursuing Net Zero Energy building performance. The Council was established in 2014 as a response to growing interest in energy responsibility from home builders and prospective home owners. The Net Zero program comes out of the previous EnviroHome program established in 1994 as a marketing tool to promote the R-2000 energy efficiency and building waste reduction building standard. EnviroHome promotion was a joint effort by CHBA and TD Canada Trust. The R-2000 program is itself a collaboration between CHBA and Natural Resources Canada (NRCan), established as a building standard in 1982 and updated in 2012.

Publications 
CHBA publishes Building Excellence quarterly print magazine and associated industry news portal and a weblog. 

CHBA also publishes the nationally bestselling CHBA Builders' Manual and its compendium text, the CHBA Renovators' Manual. 

In addition, the Association publishes several topical ePublications and archived webinars for members only. CHBA hosts a YouTube channel with a variety of webinars, contractor introductions, award ceremonies, government lobbying and other content targeted to consumers and builder/contractors.

Published Studies 
CHBA publishes a number of studies every year, most of which are available to members only. The CHBA Home Buyer Preference Survey, published annually starting in 2015, is one such document. A select few documents are available to the public from CHBA:

 Municipal Benchmarking Study, September 2020.
 Residential Construction in Canada: Economic Performance Review 2019 with 2020 Insights, September 2020
Other older annual reports, studies, and position papers may be found on provincial and local CHBA websites and through public archives.

Structure 
CHBA has nine active council and committee bodies:

 Board of Directors – Responsible for the overall governance of the Association;
 Canadian Renovators' Council – Professional interests of CHBA’s renovator members;
 Executive Committee – Oversee the ongoing direction of CHBA on the Board’s behalf;
 Executive Officers' Council – Senior staff members from local, provincial and national levels of the Association;
  – Aspects surrounding home modifications to support Canada’s seniors, persons with disabilities, and caregivers;
 Modular Construction Council – Support the increasing role of factory-built modular construction in the building industry. (This council was jointly formed in 2017 by members of the Canadian Manufactured Housing Institute and MHICanada);
 Net Zero Energy Housing Council – Established in 2014 to help members create a market advantage for Net Zero Energy Building performance;
 Technical Research Committee – Forum for building codes, standards and regulations affecting how homes are constructed and resolve issues where new technology and prior processes conflict;
 Urban Council – Issues affecting community growth: municipal infrastructure investment; new home taxes, fees, levies and charges; development regulations; and residential development and community prosperity.

Provincial Associations 
CHBA has provincial umbrella associations with several local associations.
 CHBA-British Columbia: Central Interior, Central Okanogan, South Okanagan, Vancouver Island, Fraser valley, Northern British Columbia, Sea-to-Sky, Vancouver;
 BILD Alberta: Calgary, Central, Grande Prairie, Lethbridge, Wood Buffalo, Edmonton (CHBA), Edmonton (UDI), Medicine Hat (CHBA), Lakeland;
 Saskatchewan: Regina, Saskatoon
 Manitoba HBA
 Ontario HBA: BILD (Greater Toronto Area), Brantford, Chatham-Kent, Durham Region, Greater Dufferin, Greater Ottawa, Grey-Bruce (HBTA), Guelph and District, Haldimand-Norfolk, Haliburton County, Kingston Frontenac, Lanark Leeds, London, Niagara, North Bay, Peterborough and the Kawarthas, Quinte, Sarnia-Lambton, Simcoe County, St. Thomas and Elgin, Stratford and Area, Sudbury and District, Thunder Bay, Waterloo Region, West End Home Builders' Association, Windsor Essex;
 CHBA-New Brunswick: Moncton HBA
 CHBA-Nova Scotia
 CHBA-PEI
 Newfoundland and Labrador

Past presidents
All past presidents of CHBA are members of the Past Presidents' Advisory Council, and the council is chaired by the immediate past president.

1943: Kenneth Green, Ottawa
1944: Joseph L.E. Price, Montreal
1945–46: Frank R. Lount, Winnipeg
1947–48: Hon. George Prudham, Edmonton
1949: John A. Griffin, Richmond Hill
1950–51: Frank A. Mager
1952: William H. Grisenwaite, Hamilton
1953–54: Gordon S. Shipp, Mississauga
1955–56: Harry J. Long, Toronto
1957: Lesley E. Wade, Calgary
1958–59: Maurice Joubert, Laval
1960: Campbell C. Holmes, Toronto
1961: Graham Lount, Winnipeg
1962: William M. McCance, Toronto
1963: Chesley J. McConnel, Edmonton
1964: Ernest R. Alexander, Barrie
1965: Charles B. Campbell, Hamilton
1966: Jean-Yves Gelinas, Montreal
1967: William G. Connelly, Ottawa
1968: Edward L. Mayotte, Thunder Bay
1969: Ralph T. Scurfield, Calgary
1970: S. Eric Johnson, Mississauga
1971: Harold G. Shipp, Mississauga
1972: C. Donald Wilson, Calgary
1973: H. Keith Morley, Toronto
1974: Ernest W. Assaly, Ottawa
1975: Bernard Denault, Laval
1976: Howard E. Ross, Calgary
1977: H. Eric J. Bergman, Winnipeg
1978: William E. Small, Mississauga
1979: Keith G. Paddick, Edmonton
1980: George P. Frieser, Edmonton
1981: Klaus Springer, Calgary
1982: Ctril Morgoan, St. John's
1983: Robert Flitton, Vancouver
1984: John B. Sandusky, Toronto
1985: Albert Defehr, Winnipeg
1986: Robert Shaw, Halifax
1987: Norman Godfrey, Toronto
1988: Gary Santini, Vancouver
1989: Thomas Cochren, Hamilton
1990: Gordon Thompson, Toronto
1991: Gary Reardon, St. John's
1992: John Bassel, Toronto
1993: Bill Strain, Vancouver
1995: Ted Bryk, Orangeville
1995: Bruse Clemmensen, Toronto
1996: Jerry Roehr, Winnipeg
1997: Bob McLaughlin, Quispamsis
1998: Lewis Makatsui, Edmonton
1999: Garnet Kindervater, St. John's
2000: Ken Sawatsky, Delta
2001: Dick Miller, Halifax
2002: Greg Christenson, Edmonton
2003: Jim Thompson, Kamloops
2004: Mary Lawson, Orangeville
2005: David Wassmansdorf, Burlington
2006: Dave Benbow, Thorsby
2007: Richard Lind, Bridgewater
2008: John Hrynkow, Edmonton
2009: Gary Friend, Surrey
2010: Victor Fiume

Notes

References
Kamloops Daily News, 9 June 2010

See also 

 R-2000 Program
Passive house
Canada Green Building Council
National Building Code of Canada

External links
Canadian Home Builders' Association (CHBA)
Archive.org (2010-2019): Canadian Home Builders' Association
Canada Mortgage and Housing Corporation – National Housing Strategy
Natural Resources Canada – Energy Efficiency for Homes
National Research Council Canada – Housing
National Research Council Canada – Construction Research Centre
Canadian Housing and Renewal Association
Canada Green Building Council
Passive House Canada

Trade associations based in Canada